Post-glacial clay (Swedish: Postglacial lera) is any sedimentary clay layer or deposit  that formed after retreating glaciers have abandoned an area. The term is used in Sweden. Compared to glacial clay, post-glacial clay tend to be less rich in calcium carbonate.  In some places like around Göta Älv post-glacial clay distinguishes itself by having lower silt content than the glacial clays under it.

References

Bibliography

Sediments
Clay
Types of soil